The Shipco Masters promoted by Simon's Golf Club is a men's professional golf tournament for players aged 50 and above which is part of the European Senior Tour. It was first held in June 2018 at Simon's Golf Club, Kvistgård, Denmark. It was the first European Senior Event to be held in Denmark since the 2007 Scandinavian Senior Open. The inaugural event was won by Colin Montgomerie.

The 2018 field included Laura Davies, who became the first woman to play in a European Senior Tour event. Davies was 8-over-par after 16 holes of her opening round but played the remaining 38 holes in level par to finish tied for 44th in the field of 60.

Winners

References

External links
Coverage on the European Senior Tour's official site

European Senior Tour events
Golf tournaments in Denmark
Recurring sporting events established in 2018